is a Japanese professional mixed martial artist and grappler currently competing in the Welterweight division of RIZIN. A professional competitor since 2003, he has formerly competed for the UFC, World Victory Road, Pancrase, Shooto, DREAM, Vale Tudo Japan, and DEEP. He is the former Sengoku Welterweight Champion, Shooto Pacific Rim Middleweight Champion, and also won the World Victory Road Welterweight Grand Prix Tournament in 2010.

In submission grappling, Nakamura took part in both the 2009 and 2011 ADCC Submission Wrestling World Championship, making it to the second round and winning via points in both.

Mixed martial arts career

Early career
Nakamura made his professional MMA debut in his native Japan in October 2003.  Over nearly three years, he amassed a record of 15-0-2 with wins over Yoshiyuki Yoshida, Ronald Jhun, and Daisuke Nakamura.

Ultimate Fighting Championship
Nakamura made his UFC debut in December 2006 against Brock Larson at UFC 81.  He lost the fight via unanimous decision, ending his undefeated streak.

For his second fight with the promotion, Nakamura faced Drew Fickett at UFC Fight Night: Stevenson vs. Guillard in April 2007.  He again lost the fight via unanimous decision.

Nakamura lost by contentious split decision to Rob Emerson at UFC 81 on February 2, 2008 at the Mandalay Bay Events Center in Las Vegas, Nevada. Nakamura dropped Emerson with a big knee at the end of the first round after Emerson had outstruck him for much of the round up until that point. Emerson came back strong in the second round landing crisp combinations that left Nakamura's face a mess at the end of the round. Nakamura scored takedowns in the third round on a visibly tiring Emerson while also landing some strong knees but it was not enough to win the decision as the scores read 30–27, 28-29 and 30–27 in favor of Emerson.  Following this loss, Nakamura was released from the UFC.

After the fight, the 24-year-old Nakamura announced his retirement from MMA. Disappointed by his three UFC defeats, "K-Taro" also suffered from vision issues following the Emerson bout, due his opponent's toe impairing his vision after a high kick attempt.

Return to Japan
Despite his claim that he would become a police officer, Nakamura's retirement lasted a mere few months. He returned in September 2008 as he faced Adriano Martins in for the DREAM promotion.  He won the fight via unanimous decision.

Nakamura suffered a devastating loss to heavy underdog Korean fighter, Jang Yong Kim in his second post-retirement comeback fight. Since then, he has seen a resurgence, going 13-2-1 over the next few years, including winning the Sengoku Welterweight Grand Prix with a submission victory over Yasubey Enomoto.

UFC return
Nakamura returned to the UFC in September 2015.  He faced Li Jingliang on September 27, 2015 at UFC Fight Night 75.  After being bloodied by his opponent over two rounds, Nakamura rallied back to win the fight via submission in the third round.  The win also earned Nakamura his first Performance of the Night bonus award.

Nakamura faced Tom Breese on February 27, 2016 at UFC Fight Night 84. He lost the fight via unanimous decision.

Nakamura faced Kyle Noke on July 13, 2016 at UFC Fight Night 91. He won the fight via submission in final seconds of the second round.

Nakamura next faced Elizeu Zaleski dos Santos on October 1, 2016 at UFC Fight Night 96. He lost the fight via unanimous decision.

Nakamura faced Alex Morono at UFC Fight Night: Saint Preux vs. Okami on September 23, 2017. He won the fight by split decision (29-28, 28–29, 29-28).

Nakamura faced Tony Martin on April 21, 2018 at UFC Fight Night 128. He lost the fight by unanimous decision.

Nakamura faced Salim Touahri on December 2, 2018 at UFC Fight Night 142. He won the fight via split decision.

Nakamura faced Sultan Aliev on April 20, 2019 at UFC Fight Night 149. He lost the fight via unanimous decision.

In September 2019, it was reported that Nakamura was released by UFC.

Post-UFC career
After the release from the UFC, Nakamura signed with RIZIN. After winning his promotional debut via TKO, he next faced Lorenz Larkin at Bellator & RIZIN: Japan on December 29, 2019. He lost the fight by unanimous decision.

Championships and accomplishments
Shooto
Shooto Pacific Rim Middleweight (167 lb) Championship (One time)
Sengoku Raiden Championship
SRC Welterweight Championship (One time)
2010 Sengoku Welterweight Grand Prix Winner
Deep
DEEP Welterweight Championship (One time)
Ultimate Fighting Championship
Performance of the Night (One time)

Mixed martial arts record

|-
|Loss
|align=center|35–11–2 (1)
|Lorenz Larkin
|Decision (unanimous)
|Bellator & Rizin: Japan
|
|align=center|3
|align=center|5:00
|Saitama, Japan
|
|-
|Win
|align=center|35–10–2 (1)
|Marcos de Souza
|TKO (punches)
|Rizin 19
|
|align=center|1
|align=center|1:18
|Osaka, Japan
|  
|-
|Loss
|align=center| (1)
|Sultan Aliev
|Decision (unanimous)
|UFC Fight Night: Overeem vs. Oleinik 
|
|align=center|3
|align=center|5:00
|Saint Petersburg, Russia
|
|-
|Win
|align=center|34–9–2 (1)
|Salim Touahri
|Decision (split)
|UFC Fight Night: dos Santos vs. Tuivasa 
|
|align=center|3
|align=center|5:00
|Adelaide, Australia
|  
|-
|Loss
|align=center|33–9–2 (1)
|Anthony Rocco Martin
|Decision (unanimous)
|UFC Fight Night: Barboza vs. Lee
|
|align=center| 3
|align=center| 5:00
|Atlantic City, New Jersey, United States
|
|-
|Win
|align=center|33–8–2 (1)
|Alex Morono
|Decision (split)
|UFC Fight Night: Saint Preux vs. Okami 
|
|align=center|3
|align=center|5:00
|Saitama, Japan
|
|-
|Loss
|align=center|32–8–2 (1)
|Elizeu Zaleski dos Santos
| Decision (unanimous)
|UFC Fight Night: Lineker vs. Dodson
|
|align=center| 3
|align=center| 5:00
|Portland, Oregon, United States
|   
|-
|Win
|align=center|32–7–2 (1)
|Kyle Noke
|Submission (rear-naked choke)
|UFC Fight Night: McDonald vs. Lineker
|
|align=center|2
|align=center|4:59
|Sioux Falls, South Dakota, United States
|
|-
|Loss
|align=center|31–7–2 (1)
|Tom Breese
|Decision (unanimous)
|UFC Fight Night: Silva vs. Bisping
|
|align=center|3
|align=center|5:00
|London, England
|
|-
|Win
| align=center| 31–6–2 (1) 
| Li Jingliang
| Technical Submission (rear-naked choke)
| UFC Fight Night: Barnett vs. Nelson
| 
| align=center|3
| align=center|2:17
| Saitama, Japan
|
|-
| Win
| align=center| 30–6–2 (1)
| Yuta Watanabe
| Submission (rear-naked choke)
| DEEP: Cage Impact 2015
| 
| align=center| 1
| align=center| 2:00
| Tokyo, Japan
| 
|-
| Win
| align=center| 29–6–2 (1)
| Yoshiyuki Katahira
| Submission (rear-naked choke)
| DEEP: 71 Impact
| 
| align=center| 1
| align=center| 3:47
| Tokyo, Japan
|
|-
| Win
| align=center| 28–6–2 (1)
| Yuki Okano
| TKO (punches)
| DEEP: 69 Impact
| 
| align=center| 2
| align=center| 0:26
| Tokyo, Japan
|
|-
| Win
| align=center| 27–6–2 (1)
| Keiichiro Yamamiya
| TKO (punches)
| DEEP: 67 Impact
| 
| align=center| 1
| align=center| 4:13
| Tokyo, Japan
|
|-
| Loss
| align=center| 26–6–2 (1)
| Frank Camacho
| Decision (unanimous)
| PXC: Pacific Xtreme Combat 42
| 
| align=center| 3
| align=center| 5:00
| Mangilao, Guam
| 
|-
| NC
| align=center| 26–5–2 (1)
| Kwang Hee Lee
| NC (Nakamura missed weight)
| DEEP: 64th Impact
| 
| align=center| N/A
| align=center| N/A
| Tokyo, Japan
|
|-
| Win
| align=center| 26–5–2
| Kota Shimoishi
| Submission (rear-naked choke)
| Shooto: 3rd Round
| 
| align=center| 2
| align=center| 0:37
| Tokyo, Japan
|
|-
| Win
| align=center| 25–5–2
| Nobutatsu Suzuki
| Submission (rear-naked choke)
| Vale Tudo Japan 2012
| 
| align=center| 1
| align=center| 2:09
| Tokyo, Japan
|
|-
| Win
| align=center| 24–5–2
| Yuki Sasaki
| Decision (unanimous)
| Shooto: 5th Round
| 
| align=center| 3
| align=center| 5:00
| Tokyo, Japan
| 
|-
| Win
| align=center| 23–5–2
| Hoon Kim
| TKO (broken hand)
| LFC: Legend Fighting Championship 8
| 
| align=center| 1
| align=center| 5:00
| Chek Lap Kok, China
| 
|-
| Win
| align=center| 22–5–2
| Yoichiro Sato
| Decision (majority)
| Shooto: Survivor Tournament Final
| 
| align=center| 3
| align=center| 5:00
| Tokyo, Japan
| 
|-
| Loss
| align=center| 21–5–2
| Akihiro Murayama
| Submission (rear-naked choke)
| Shooto: Shootor's Legacy 4
| 
| align=center| 1
| align=center| 2:30
| Tokyo, Japan
| 
|-
| Win
| align=center| 21–4–2
| Yasubey Enomoto
| Submission (rear-naked choke)
| World Victory Road Presents: Soul of Fight
| 
| align=center| 2
| align=center| 3:48
| Tokyo, Japan
| 
|-
| Win
| align=center| 20–4–2
| Takuya Wada
| Submission (punches)
| World Victory Road Presents: Sengoku Raiden Championships 15
| 
| align=center| 1
| align=center| 3:30
| Tokyo, Japan
| 
|-
| Win
| align=center| 19–4–2
| Omar de la Cruz
| TKO (punches)
| World Victory Road Presents: Sengoku Raiden Championships 13
| 
| align=center| 2
| align=center| 3:53
| Tokyo, Japan
| 
|-
| Win
| align=center| 18–4–2
| Tomoyoshi Iwamiya
| Decision (majority)
| GCM: Cage Force 11
| 
| align=center| 3
| align=center| 5:00
| Tokyo, Japan
|
|-
| Loss
| align=center| 17–4–2
| Jang Yong Kim
| TKO (punches)
| GCM: Cage Force EX Eastern Bound
| 
| align=center| 1
| align=center| 0:59
| Tokyo, Japan
| 
|-
| Win
| align=center| 17–3–2
| Adriano Martins
| Decision (split)
| Dream 6: Middleweight Grand Prix 2008 Final Round
| 
| align=center| 2
| align=center| 5:00
| Saitama, Japan
| 
|-
| Loss
| align=center| 16–3–2
| Rob Emerson
| Decision (split)
| UFC 81
| 
| align=center| 3
| align=center| 5:00
| Las Vegas, Nevada, United States
| 
|-
| Win
| align=center| 16–2–2
| Takefumi Hanai
| TKO (knees)
| GCM: Cage Force EX Eastern Bound
| 
| align=center| 1
| align=center| 1:59
| Tokyo, Japan
| 
|-
| Loss
| align=center| 15–2–2
| Drew Fickett
| Decision (unanimous)
| UFC Fight Night: Stevenson vs. Guillard
| 
| align=center| 3
| align=center| 5:00
| Las Vegas, Nevada, United States
| 
|-
| Loss
| align=center| 15–1–2
| Brock Larson
| Decision (unanimous)
| UFC Fight Night: Sanchez vs. Riggs
| 
| align=center| 3
| align=center| 5:00
| San Diego, California, United States
| 
|-
| Win
| align=center| 15–0–2
| Djalili Salmanov
| Submission (rear-naked choke)
| GCM: D.O.G. 7
| 
| align=center| 1
| align=center| 3:50
| Tokyo, Japan
| 
|-
| Win
| align=center| 14–0–2
| Ronald Jhun
| Technical Submission (rear-naked choke)
| PIP: East vs. West
| 
| align=center| 1
| align=center| 3:55
| Honolulu, Hawaii, United States
| 
|-
| Win
| align=center| 13–0–2
| Jun Yong Jae
| Submission (rear-naked choke)
| MARS World Grand Prix
| 
| align=center| 1
| align=center| 1:58
| Seoul, South Korea
| 
|-
| Win
| align=center| 12–0–2
| Yoshiyuki Yoshida
| Technical Decision (majority)
| Shooto: 12/17 in Shinjuku Face
| 
| align=center| 2
| align=center| 4:06
| Tokyo, Japan
| 
|-
| Win
| align=center| 11–0–2
| Katsuaki Niioka
| Submission (rear-naked choke)
| Shooto 2005: 11/6 in Korakuen Hall
| 
| align=center| 1
| align=center| 2:10
| Tokyo, Japan
| 
|-
| Win
| align=center| 10–0–2
| Mohamed Khacha
| Submission (rear-naked choke)
| GCM: D.O.G. 3
| 
| align=center| 1
| align=center| 3:34
| Tokyo, Japan
| 
|-
| Win
| align=center| 9–0–2
| Taro Minato
| Submission (rear-naked choke)
| GCM: Demolition 22
| 
| align=center| 1
| align=center| 4:03
| Tokyo, Japan
| 
|-
| Win
| align=center| 8–0–2
| Jun Kitagawa
| Decision (unanimous)
| Shooto: 6/3 in Kitazawa Town Hall
| 
| align=center| 2
| align=center| 5:00
| Tokyo, Japan
| 
|-
| Win
| align=center| 7–0–2
| Kentaro Maeda
| Decision (unanimous)
| Shooto: 2/6 in Kitazawa Town Hall
| 
| align=center| 2
| align=center| 5:00
| Tokyo, Japan
| 
|-
| Win
| align=center| 6–0–2
| Atsushi Inoue
| Submission (rear-naked choke)
| GCM: Demolition 20
| 
| align=center| 1
| align=center| 2:11
| Tokyo, Japan
| 
|-
| Draw
| align=center| 5–0–2
| Kazunori Yokata
| Draw
| GCM: Demolition 18
| 
| align=center| 2
| align=center| 5:00
| Tokyo, Japan
| 
|-
| Win
| align=center| 5–0–1
| Keisuke Sakai
| Submission (rear-naked choke)
| Shooto: 7/16 in Korakuen Hall
| 
| align=center| 1
| align=center| 2:20
| Tokyo, Japan
| 
|-
| Win
| align=center| 4–0–1
| Ichiro Kanai
| Decision (unanimous)
| GCM: Demolition 15
| 
| align=center| 2
| align=center| 5:00
| Tokyo, Japan
| 
|-
| Win
| align=center| 3–0–1
| Daisuke Nakamura
| Decision (unanimous)
| GCM: Demolition 14
| 
| align=center| 2
| align=center| 5:00
| Tokyo, Japan
| 
|-
| Draw
| align=center| 2–0–1
| Ichiro Kanai
| Draw
| GCM: Demolition 12
| 
| align=center| 2
| align=center| 5:00
| Tokyo, Japan
| 
|-
| Win
| align=center| 2–0
| Kenta Omori
| Submission (triangle choke)
| Kingdom Ehrgeiz: Tokyo University Flight
| 
| align=center| 1
| align=center| 7:44
| Tokyo, Japan
| 
|-
| Win
| align=center| 1–0
| Tomohito Tanizaki
| TKO (punches)
| Kingdom Ehrgeiz: Tomorrow
| 
| align=center| 1
| align=center| 0:33
| Tokyo, Japan
|

References

External links

 

1984 births
Living people
Japanese practitioners of Brazilian jiu-jitsu
Japanese male judoka
Japanese male mixed martial artists
Welterweight mixed martial artists
Lightweight mixed martial artists
Mixed martial artists utilizing judo
Mixed martial artists utilizing Brazilian jiu-jitsu
Sportspeople from Tokyo
Wajitsu Keishukai
Ultimate Fighting Championship male fighters